Emmanuel Lescure (c. 1930 – 1 April 2017) was a French businessman, and the chairman of Groupe SEB from 1976 to 1990.

Early life
Lescure was one of eleven children of Louis-Frédéric Lescure, CEO of Groupe SEB from 1953 to 1972, and his wife Françoise Lescure née Helie.

Career

Lescure spent his whole career with Groupe SEB, and was the chairman from 1976 to 1990.

Personal life and death
Lescure had seven children:
Vincent Lescure, married Christine 
Bénédicte Lescure, married Thierry de La Tour d'Artaise
Isabelle Lescure, married Laurent Bouzoud
Dominique Lescure, married Joseph de Bucy
Pascale Lescure, married Jérôme Wittlin
Bertrand Lescure, married Emmeline 
Raphaële Lescure, married François Mirallié

Lescure died in Dijon on 1 April 2017, aged 87.

References

1930s births
2017 deaths
French businesspeople
Emmanuel